The 2017 European Individual Speedway Junior Championship (also known as the 2017 Speedway European Under 21 Championship) was the 20th edition of the U21 Championship. It was won by Robert Lambert.

Lambert also won the U19 title.

Under 21
The final was staged at Daugavpils in Latvia and was won by Robert Lambert of England.

Final
 26 August 2017
  Daugavpils

Under 19
The final was staged at Divišov in Czech Republic and was won by Robert Lambert of England.

Final
 12 August 2017
  Divišov

See also 
 2017 Speedway European Championship

References

Individual Speedway Junior European Championship
2017 in speedway
2017 in Swedish motorsport
International sports competitions hosted by France